So Much for the Ten Year Plan: A Retrospective 1990–2000 is a compilation album by the Northern Irish rock band Therapy? and the second to be released by Ark 21 Records. It was released on 2 October 2000 and allowed the band to fulfill some outstanding obligations to Universal Records. Two new tracks, "Bad Karma Follows You Around" and "Fat Camp", were specially recorded in May 2000 for inclusion on the album. The album reached number 111 in the UK Albums Chart.

The album was released on CD only. The UK limited edition contains a bonus disc with six tracks.

Track listing

Single 
"Bad Karma Follows You Around" was released in 2000 as a promo only single with "Fat Camp"

Promo video 
"Bad Karma Follows You Around"

Personnel 
Therapy?
Andy Cairns – vocals, guitar
Michael McKeegan – bass, backing vocals
Graham Hopkins – drums, vocals (on tracks 2, 5, 7, 10, 11, 12, 16)
Martin McCarrick – guitar, cello, vocals (on tracks 2, 5, 7, 8, 10, 11, 12, 13, 16)
Fyfe Ewing – vocals, drums (on tracks 1, 3, 4, 6, 8, 9, 14, 15)
Technical
Harvey Birrell – producer (on tracks 6, 9, 15)
Al Clay – producer (on tracks 8 & 13)
Head – producer (on tracks 2, 7, 10, 12, 16)
Chris Sheldon – producer (on tracks 1, 3, 5, 11, 14)
Mudd Wallace and Therapy? – producer (on track 4)
Therapy?/Insect – design

Charts

References 

2000 compilation albums
Ark 21 Records albums
Therapy? albums